Stella Zambalis is an American spinto soprano born in Cleveland, Ohio. She has been called one of the best sopranos in the world today.

Education and early career
Zambalis began her studies with Greek mezzo-soprano Elena Nikolaidi at Florida State University. Zambalis moved to Houston along with Nikolaidi where she became a member of the Houston Grand Opera young artist program. She was the 1983 winner of the Metropolitan Opera National Council Auditions. She began her career as a mezzo-soprano and switched to soprano in the mid 1990s.

Recordings
She can be heard on the 1984 Leonard Bernstein recording of West Side Story, 1992 Metropolitan Opera recording of Mozart's Marriage of Figaro (Levine), Tchaikovsky's Romeo and Juliet: Overture Fantasy for Bridge Records and on Dvorak's three complete solo song cycles for the Opus record label.

On video
Seattle Opera's War and Peace
1992 Metropolitan Opera's Marriage of Figaro, Mozart, James Levine Conducting
PBS's The Making of West Side Story

Roles
She created the role of the stepmother in Robert Moran's and Philip Glass' The Juniper Tree and reprised the role in its New York City debut April 2007 at Lincoln Center. In January 2007 she debuted as Bellini's Norma (opera) for Mercury Opera In Rochester NY. She frequently performs the role of Nedda in I Pagliacci as well as all of the Puccini heroines.

Mimi in La Bohème, Deutsche Oper Berlin/New York City Opera/Opera Company of Philadelphia/Baltimore Opera/Opera Columbus/Kentucky Opera/Arizona Opera/Michigan Opera/Opera Pacific/Tulsa Opera/Arkansas Symphony
Floria Tosca in Tosca, Columbus (debut)/Tacoma Opera/Fargo Morehead/Chattanooga Symph & Opera/Arkansas Symphony/others
Cherubino (Created) in John Corigliano's The Ghosts of Versailles, Metropolitan Opera
Rosina in Il Barbiere di Siviglia, New York City Opera/Deutsche Oper Berlin/Indianapolis/Opera Theater of Saint Louis/others (at least 23 total productions)
Magda in La Rondine, New York City Opera
The Three Heroines in Les Contes d’Hoffmann, Opera Columbus/New York City Opera/Chautauqua Opera/Knoxville Opera
Giulietta in Les Contes d’Hoffmann, Tulsa Opera
Micaela in Carmen, New York City Opera/Michigan Opera/Minnesota Opera/Tulsa Opera
Zerlina in Don Giovanni, Houston Grand Opera/Opera Omaha/Indianapolis Opera
Dorabella in Cosi fan Tutte, Houston Grand Opera/Seattle Opera
Musetta in La Bohème, Houston Grand Opera
Nedda in I Pagliacci, Houston Grand Opera/Opera Co. of Philadelphia/Portland Opera/Arizona Opera/New Orleans Opera
Sophie in Prokofieff's War and Peace, Seattle Opera
Norma in Norma, Mercury Opera Rochester 
Adalgisa in Norma, Florida Grand Opera/Opera Hamilton
Violetta in La Traviata, Austin Lyric Opera
Countess in Le Nozze di Figaro, Festival of Two Worlds in Spoleto, Italy/Austin Lyric Opera/Opera Hamilton/San Antonio Symphony
Angelina in La Cenerentola, Florentine Opera
Liu in Turandot, Indianapolis Opera/Nashville Opera/Florentine Opera/Tulsa Opera/Chattanooga
Hermia in A Midsummer Night’s Dream, Minnesota Opera/Kentucky Opera
Donna Elvira in Don Giovanni, Kentucky Opera/Indianapolis Opera
Fiordiligi in Cosi fan Tutte, Kentucky Opera
Pamina in The Magic Flute, Opera Company of Philadelphia
Rosalinda in Die Fledermaus, Opera Company of Philadelphia/Houston Grand Opera/Tacoma Opera/Arizona Opera 
Donna Elvira in Don Giovanni, Opera Company of Philadelphia/Chattanooga Opera/Opera Omaha
Donna Anna in Don Giovanni, Knoxville Opera/Chattanooga/
"Soprano" in Carmina Burana, Portland Opera
Marguerite in Faust, Portland Opera
double bill of Pagliacci and Carmina Burana, Opera Omaha
Trouble in Tahiti, La Scala
Donna Anna in Don Giovanni, Chattanooga Symphony and Opera
Inez in Maria Padilla, Opera Omaha
The Stepmother (created) in Philip Glass and Robert Moran's The Juniper Tree, Opera Omaha
Euridice in Gluck's Orfeo ed Euridice, Indianapolis Opera
Giovanna Seymour in Anna Bolena, Indianapolis Opera
Hanna in The Merry Widow, Indianapolis Opera/San Antonio Symphony
Violetta in La Traviata, Austin Lyric/Madison Opera
Lucy Lockett in The Beggar's Opera, Opera Theater of Saint Louis
Angelina, Opera Theater of Saint Louis
Tessa in The Gondoliers, Opera Theater of Saint Louis
Valencienne in The Merry Widow, Opera Theater of Saint Louis
Sara in Roberto Devereux, Opera Orchestra of New York in Carnegie Hall
Walter in La Wally, Opera Orchestra of New York in Carnegie Hall

Roles created
Cherubino in The Ghosts of Versailles Metropolitan Opera, John Corigliano
The Stepmother in Philip Glass' and Robert Moran's The Juniper Tree (Reprised at Lincoln Center for New York Premier 2007)
The Woman in Robert Moran's Desert of Roses Houston Grand Opera
The title role in the world premiere of Rachel for the Knoxville Opera, with additional performances in Nashville with Nashville Opera

Concert performances
Beethoven's "Missa Solemnis", Santiago, Chile
Strauss' "Four Last Songs", Houston, Pittsburgh and San Francisco Ballets
Solo Quartet of Brahms' "Liebeslieder Waltzes with Mischa and Cipa Dichter", Houston Symphony
Soprano Soloist with the late Robert Shaw in Verdi's Requiem in New York with the Little Orchestra Society
Youngstown Symphony in the Mozart Requiem
Multiple appearances with the New Bedford Symphony Orchestra as guest soloist
Erie Symphony for a New Year's Day concert
Greenville Symphony in Verdi's Requiem
Houston Masterworks for Beethoven's "Symphony No. 9" and Vaughan Williams' "Benedicite"
Festival of Two Worlds in Spoleto, Italy as soprano soloist in Menotti's Mass and his Cantata to St. Teresa of Avila: Muero, Porque no Muero, which she also performed with the Radio Symphony Orchestra of Berlin
Featured soloist under the baton of Raphael Frubech de Burgos in Rossini's Stabat Mater with the Rundfunk Symphony Orchestra in Berlin

References 

Living people
American operatic sopranos
University of Houston alumni
Florida State University alumni
Winners of the Metropolitan Opera National Council Auditions
Musicians from Cleveland
Operatic mezzo-sopranos
American mezzo-sopranos
20th-century American women opera singers
Classical musicians from Ohio
Year of birth missing (living people)
21st-century American women